The 2005 Cowansville municipal election was held on November 6, 2005, to elect a mayor and councillors in Cowansville, Quebec. Incumbent mayor Arthur Fauteux was re-elected without opposition.

Results

Source: "Meet your new municipal councils," Sherbrooke Record, 8 November 2005, p. 7.

References

Cowansville
2005 Quebec municipal elections